The 1953 Fresno State Bulldogs football team represented Fresno State College—now known as California State University, Fresno—as a member of the California Collegiate Athletic Association (CCAA) during the 1953 college football season. The Bulldogs rejoined CCAA after having played as an independent in the 1951 and 1952 seasons. Led by second-year head coach Clark Van Galder, Fresno State compiled an overall record of 4–4–2 with a mark of 2–2–1 in conference play, placing third in the CCAA. The Bulldogs played home games at Ratcliffe Stadium on the campus of Fresno City College in Fresno, California.

Schedule

Team players in the NFL
The following were selected in the 1954 NFL Draft.

Notes

References

Fresno State
Fresno State Bulldogs football seasons
Fresno State Bulldogs football